Ralph Wesley Foody (November 13, 1928 – November 21, 1999) was an American actor. He was best known for his role as Johnny in Home Alone and Home Alone 2: Lost in New York.

Early life 
Foody was born in Chicago, Illinois on November 13, 1928.

Career
Foody had several screen credits from the 1980s, including the Arnold Schwarzenegger movie Raw Deal and 1991's Dillinger, which featured fellow gangster actor Lawrence Tierney. 

In 1990 Foody played 1930s mobster Johnny in the 1990 film Home Alone and its 1992 sequel Home Alone 2: Lost in New York. As Johnny, Foody appears in two black-and-white gangster films-within-the-films Angels with Filthy Souls and its sequel Angels with Even Filthier Souls (both are a parody of the 1938 film Angels with Dirty Faces by Warner Bros.). His appearances are notable for the famous catchphrases 'Keep the change ya filthy animal' and 'Merry Christmas ya filthy animal — and a Happy New Year'. His appearance in Home Alone 2: Lost in New York was also his final film role. 

Foody also played Det. Cragie, the alcoholic and the negligent Chicago cop in Code of Silence, as well as the police dispatcher in The Blues Brothers. He was also known for his incredible wit and was often referred to as "The Witster" on set. 

After filming Home Alone 2: Lost in New York, Foody retired from acting. He moved to Lexington, Kentucky where he remained until his death.

Death 
Foody died of cancer in 1999 at age 71.

Filmography

References

External links 
 
 

American male film actors
American male television actors
1928 births
1999 deaths
Deaths from cancer in Kentucky
Male actors from Chicago
20th-century American male actors